William Borden is the name of:

William Whiting Borden (1887–1913), American philanthropist and missionary
William Cline Borden (1858–1934), American surgeon and planner of Walter Reed Army Medical Center
William L. Borden (1920–1985), American congressional aide and figure in the Oppenheimer security case